John Gray McCulloch (15 July 1896 – 1935) was a Scottish footballer who played for Dumbarton, Rangers and Airdrieonians.

References

1896 births
1935 deaths
Scottish footballers
Dumbarton F.C. players
Rangers F.C. players
Airdrieonians F.C. (1878) players
Scottish Football League players
Scottish Junior Football Association players
Vale of Clyde F.C. players
Association football forwards
Sportspeople from Rutherglen
Footballers from South Lanarkshire